Lagrán is a town and municipality located in the province of Álava, in the Basque Country, northern Spain.
Its name comes from: larra-gran which in Spanish means sobre el prado. Its main webpage is: www.lagran.org
It is located in the south part of Álava in a valley where the river Ega is born. It has an altitude of 756 m above the sea level and near the village, at only 3 km from there, are mountains with a heigh of 1,400 m. There is a huge variety of species of animals or either plants. In this valley potatoes and different types of cereals are grown, for commercial purpose or even for its direct consumption. In the border of this valley there are several forests. There can be frequently seen hunters around this area, either major or minor hunting, because of its variety of fauna. It actually has 126 inhabitants, and it is considered to be the oldest village in Alava, its age average is around 70 years old. 

The mayor also controls another 2 towns, called Villaverde (1km away of Lagrán) and Pipaón (7km away of Lagrán) being Lagrán the town with most population of the 3. Villaverde became more famous after Eva Garcia Saenz de Urturi published the books of the white city (The silence of the White City, Water Rituals, "Los señores del Tiempo" and "El libro negro de las horas") because it´s the town of the granfather of the author and the main character of the books.

History
There is little early evidence of this village, but the first documents using the name are from 1165. It was not considered a village then. In 1515, it started to be considered as a village. In the 15th century, Lagrán was no longer an independent village when it became part of the kingdom of the Conde de Salinas and later became part of the kingdom of the Duques de Híjar.

Demography
When we speak about the demography of this village we can say that it has become to be a small village from being a big or normal village.

Interesting places
Actually the town of Lagrán has 1 café opened next to the fronton. Also there´s a zone next to the Saint Bartolomew hermitage (1.6km (1 mille) away of the town centre) in which people can camp and in summer is very used by groups of teenagers. Also it has a church called in spanish "Iglesia de la Natividad" placed in the highest point of the town.

Hiking
There are few activities, but it is possible to play bowl or play vasque fronton, cestapunta, frontennis, futsal and baketball. There are many mountains to climb or places to walk. It was able to play golf on a 9 holes course that was 1km away from the town but it closed on 28th of february of 2013, so since then the nearest course o play golf is placed in Urturi, 12km away.

Senda De Las Carboneras A-PR-50 - This path goes from Lagrán to Cruz del Castillo, before it served to communicate the Cantabrian Sea ports with the people of the Rioja and to trade with oil, bread, and wool in exchange for coal, lime, potatoes, pickled fish etc. On this path you can see three representations that explain the process of making charcoal, one of the greatest cultural treasures of the valley, and some tree species that contribute to enjoy of this walk.

Senda Del Lavadero A-PR-51 - The path which goes from the laundry of Lagrán illustrates the walker a variety of flora and fauna posters, and explanations of the valley. Can also be seen an old site where lime was fabricated and the remains of a sawmill in the mountains.

Senda Del Monte Jaundel A-PR-52 - Along the way we will know some aspects of the landscape, artificial lakes which some farmers made for their animals and a mountain which is between to villages and in the past was used for commercial purposes. We also find some animals and plants species, and a curious machine called "El Burro" which in the past was used to carry thin woods to where the charcoal was made.

Senda De Lagrán A Pipaón A-PR-53 - This path connects the two rural villages covering part of the old existing road and crossing the old lake for watering "La Salmuera" and then returning to the forest where many beeches can be found. Here are explanatory signs of different animals and plants species. You can see the remains of a clay quarry . There also will be explained by some signs how the beeches were used for commercial purposes and also an old hydroelectric generator, and at the same time you will be able to use an observatory of birds. In the village you can visit the Pipaón " Ethnographic Museum " by the Usatxi Cultural Association of Dallas.

Senda De San Bartolomé A-PR-54 - A camping area for groups, with tables, benches, barbecues and a shelter with berths, electricity, toilets, showers etc. But for its use the Lagrán hall must be consulted. This may be the most appropriate point for exploring all the paths. This route, although it can provide all kind of interesting aspects, it is designed for young people, because it is an unknown route, with many posters located around the area, and which may come from different places.

Senda De Lagrán A Villaverde A-PR-55 - This route shares its beginning with the Senda Del Lavadero A-PR-51, going through the Escuela de Golf (closed in february of 2013) and comes to Villaverde. In it you can see posters of the vegetation in the area (beech, oak forest, oak), microfauna (rodents), raptors and other wildlife are explained.

Feasts of Lagrán
New year (1st january)
 Semana santa
 San Bartolomé (don´t have an exact date but are around the 24th of august which is the mayor day of this mayor feast)
 Day of the march (7th december)
Christmas eve (24th december)
Chistmas (25th december)
New year´s eve (31st december)

References

External links
 Official website of the Lagran council
 LAGRÁN in the Bernardo Estornés Lasa - Auñamendi Encyclopedia 

Municipalities in Álava